Goldstine is a surname. Notable people with the surname include:

Adele Goldstine (1920–1964), American computer programmer
Herman Goldstine (1913–2004), American mathematician and computer scientist
Israel Goldstine (1898–1953), New Zealand politician
Susan Goldstine, American mathematician

See also
Goldstein (disambiguation)